18 Aquarii is a single, yellow-white hued star in the equatorial constellation of Aquarius. The designation is from the catalogue of English astronomer John Flamsteed, first published in 1712.

This is an F-type main sequence star with a stellar classification of F0 V. It is an estimated 480 million years old and has a high rate of spin with a projected rotational velocity of 138 km/s. The star has 1.54 times the mass of the Sun and is radiating 11.8 times the Sun's luminosity from its photosphere at an effective temperature of 7,194 K.

References

External links
 Image 18 Aquarii

F-type main-sequence stars
Aquarius (constellation)
Durchmusterung objects
Aquarii, 018
203705
105668
8187